The Chenzhou Olympic Sports Centre is a sports complex in Chenzhou, Hunan, China. The centre comprises a 30,000-seat multi-purpose stadium named Chenzhou Olympic Sports Centre Stadium, a 5,000-seat indoor stadium, as well as facilities for basketball, volleyball, badminton, table tennis, tennis, weightlifting, wushu, and other sports. The center is near Xiangnan University. It cost  to build.

References

Football venues in China
Multi-purpose stadiums in China
Chenzhou
Sports venues in Hunan
Tennis venues in China
2010 establishments in China
Sports venues completed in 2010